Acacia tabula, commonly known as Wombargo wattle, is a species of Acacia of subgenus Phyllodineae that is endemic to north eastern Victoria, Australia.

Description
Like most species of Acacia it has phyllodes rather than true leaves. The glabrous, thinly textured and evergreen phyllodes have an inequilaterally narrowly oblong to elliptic shape. It flowers between August and October, producing racemose inflorescences have small spherical flower-heads globular with a diameter of  containing five to eight golden coloured flowers.

Distribution
It has a limited distribution from around Splitters Creek to the south of Wulgulmerang where it is usually a part of open dry forest communities growing in shallow soils that are derived from sediments. It is often associated from Acacia infecunda and Acacia nanopravissima. It is restricted to a small population in the upper catchment Little River which flows into the Snowy River on the Wombargo Range in as a group of small fragmented stands that are relatively close to each other.

See also
List of Acacia species

References

tabula
Flora of Victoria (Australia)
Plants described in 2008